The 2015 Sheikh Kamal International Club Cup, also known as Sheikh Kamal Gold Cup 2015, was the 1st edition of Sheikh Kamal International Club Cup, an international club football tournament hosted by the Chittagong Abahani in association with the Bangladesh Football Federation. This tournament took place at the M. A. Aziz Stadium from 20 October 2015 to 30 October 2015 in the port city of Chittagong. Participation fees for each team was  5000.

Chittagong Abahani won the inaugural edition of the tournament by defeating East Bengal 3–1.

Participating teams
Eight clubs sent their teams to participate in the tournament from five nations of AFC Three team from Bangladesh, two from India, one of each from Sri Lanka, Pakistan as well as Afghanistan participated.

Following are the participated teams:
 Chittagong Abahani (Host)
 Abahani Limited Dhaka
 Mohammedan Dhaka
 Mohammedan
 East Bengal
 K-Electric
 Solid SC
 De Spin Ghar Bazan

Round

Prize money
Prize money for 2015 Sheikh Kamal International Club Cup.

Draw
The draw ceremony was held 19:00 BST at Pan Pacific Hotel Sonargaon Dhaka on 12 October 2015.The Eight teams were divided into two groups. Top two teams from each group will move into the Semi-Finals.

Group draw

Group stage
All times are Bangladesh Standard Time (BST) – UTC+06:00.
The eight participants are divided into two groups. The top two teams from each group will move on to the semifinals.

Group A

Group B

Knockout stage
 Bracket

Semi-finals

Final

Winners

Statistics

Top scorers

Sponsorship

 SAIF Powertec Ltd. (Title Sponsor) – 2015
 Abul Khair Group (A.K.S) – 2015
 MARKS – 2015
 Muskan Group – 2015
 Dhaka Bank Limited
 Gonona Technologies Ltd. – 2015
 SAIF Powertec Ltd. (Sponsorship Rights Holder) – 2017

Media partners
Channel 9 (Bangladesh) – 2015
Mashranga TV (Bangladesh) – 2017
Razzi TV (Maldives) – 2017

References

External links
 Sheikh Kamal International Club Championship 2015

Sheikh Kamal International Club Cup
Bangladesh
1